Frank Parker defeated Budge Patty 6–3, 1–6, 6–1, 6–4 in the final to win the men's singles tennis title at the 1949 French Championships.

Seeds
The seeded players are listed below. Frank Parker is the champion; others show the round in which they were eliminated.

  Frank Parker (champion)
  Richard Gonzales (semifinals)
  Giovanni Cucelli (quarterfinals)
  Eric Sturgess (semifinals)
  Lennart Bergelin (fourth round)
  Budge Patty (finalist)
  Marcel Bernard (quarterfinals)
  Dragutin Mitić (quarterfinals)
  Paul Remy (fourth round)
  Josip Pallada (fourth round)
  Felicisimo Ampon (fourth round)
  Robert Abdesselam (quarterfinals)
  Jacques Thomas (fourth round)
  Franjo Punčec (fourth round)
  Torsten Johansson (fourth round)
  Ricardo Balbiers (fourth round)

Draw

Key
 Q = Qualifier
 WC = Wild card
 LL = Lucky loser
 r = Retired

Finals

Earlier rounds

Section 1

Section 2

Section 3

Section 4

Section 5

Section 6

Section 7

Section 8

References

External links
   on the French Open website

1949 in French tennis
1949